Pseudoligia is a genus of moths of the family Noctuidae.

Species
 Pseudoligia similiaria (Ménétriés, 1849)
 Pseudoligia lucifer L.Ronkay & Gyulai, 2008

References
Natural History Museum Lepidoptera genus database
Pseudoligia at funet
 Ronkay, L. & Gyulai, P. (2006). "Two new Noctuidae (Lepidoptera) species from Iran." Esperiana Buchreihe zur Entomologie 12: 243-248.

Hadeninae